Ilopango International Airport  is an airport located on the eastern part of the city of San Salvador, El Salvador, once serving the city as its international airport until it was replaced by the larger and more modern El Salvador International Airport, located about 50 km south of the city. Currently, Ilopango is used for military, air taxi, and charter aviation only. It also holds the annual Ilopango Air Show. The airport is also home to the National Aviation Museum (Museo Nacional de Aviación) of San Salvador, which is housed in the old terminal building.

History
Ilopango was one of the largest and busiest airports in Central America. During the civil war, due to its location, it was targeted for bombing by guerrillas. It ended its international flight service in January 1980, with the construction of the larger, more modern Comalapa International. It played a role in the Iran-Contra affair when it was used by the Reagan administration's dummy corporations to fly funding and arms to the Contra rebels in the Nicaraguan Civil War. Currently, there is a plan involving modernization and enlargement of the airport to accommodate modern aircraft. In 2001, the administration of the airport passed from the military to the Comisión Ejecutiva Portuaria Autónoma (CEPA), which is in charge of planning the modernization project.

Rehabilitation
Ilopango has the same problem of many airports in Central America: it borders on the city and has houses nearby so its runway can't be expanded. Its hangars will be relocated and modernized to serve as a modern commercial airport. CEPA has announced that they will begin rehabilitating the airport in late 2013 to allow short domestic flights within Central America.

Ilopango Airport has new signage on the main runway, and a revamped passenger room, as part of preparations being made for new airlines that will begin operating in May 2014. The President of the Civil Aviation Authority (AAC) has reported that a resurfacing of the airport's taxiway will be underway before initial operations of TAES Airlines in February 2015 and TAG Airlines in March 2015.
Volaris is in the process of getting government approval to fly between Mexico and San Salvador

Among the work completed in the old airport: adequacy of the passenger waiting room, which seats 25 people is completed. In addition to adequate seating for passengers, a new air conditioning system for traveler comfort. These facilities are slated to open in March 2015, when TAG Airlines begins operations at Ilopango Airport.

In January 2016, CEPA has begun building a new passenger terminal due to the high demands of TAG Airlines and CM Airlines. The new passenger terminal will increase capacity while providing a dedicated Salvadorean immigration and customs area. The new MSSS Ilopango Airport terminal is expected to be completed in mid-2016.

Other facilities
The El Salvador Civil Aviation Authority has its headquarters on the airport property.

Airlines and destinations

Passenger airlines

Former airlines
Aviateca (Guatemala)
Lacsa (San José (CR))
TACA [Now part of Grupo TACA] (San Pedro Sula, Tegucigalpa, Guatemala, New Orleans, Miami, México, Managua, San José, Panamá, Belize)
Copa Airlines (Panama City, Guatemala, Managua, San José, Cartagena, Barranquilla)
SAM (San Andres Island)
Iberia (Madrid via Santo Domingo)
LANICA (Nicaragua)
Pan Am (New York, Houston-Intercontinental, Los Angeles, Guatemala)
Sahsa (Tegucigalpa)

See also
Battle of Ilopango Airport

References

External links

 Museo Nacional de Aviación 

Airports in El Salvador
San Salvador